Joyce Currie Little is a computer scientist, engineer, and educator. She was a professor and chairperson in the Department of Computer and Information Sciences at Towson University in Towson, Maryland.

Background and education

She received a B.S. in Mathematics Education from the Northeast Louisiana University in 1957, an M.S. in applied mathematics from the San Diego State University in 1963, and a PhD in educational administration for computing services from the University of Maryland, College Park, in 1984.

Career and achievements

While in graduate school in San Diego, California, Joyce Currie Little worked in the aerospace industry as a computational test engineer. From 1957 to 1960, she developed programs to analyze data from models being tested in a wind tunnel for Convair Aircraft Corporation in San Diego.

After completing her M.S., Little moved to Maryland and accepted a position at Goucher College teaching statistics and managing a computer center. She also began work on her Ph.D. at the University of Maryland, College Park.  In 1967, she became the chairperson  of the Computer and Information Systems Department at the Community College of Baltimore. She moved to Towson University in Towson, Maryland, in 1981, where she was named Chairperson of the Department of Computer & Information Sciences in 1984. She has been an active member of the Association for Computing Machinery (ACM) for many years, and received their Distinguished Service Award in 1992.

She received the SIGCSE Award for Lifetime Service to the Computer Science Education Community for her contributions to computing in two-year colleges, certification, and professional development.

Research interests

Dr. Little's research interests include metrics and assurance for quality in software engineering and social impact and cyber-ethics for workforce education. She has also been a strong advocate for the role of women in computing. Her current activities include a project on the evaluation of computer ethics courses in the Computer Science major at Towson University, and a project on the social impact of certification on the industry.

Memberships

 Fellow, Association for Computing Machinery
 Association for Information Technology Professionals
 Fellow, American Association for the Advancement of Science
 Institute of Electrical and Electronics Engineers
 International Society for Technology in Education
 Maryland Association for Educational Uses of Computers, Inc.

References

Further reading

 Gurer, Denise, "Pioneering Women in Computer Science." ACM SIGCSE Bulletin, Volume 34, Issue 2. ACM Press, 2002.
 Little, Joyce Currie, "The Role of Women in the History of Computing." Proceedings, Women and Technology: Historical, Societal, and Professional Perspectives. IEEE International Symposium on Technology and Society, New Brunswick, NJ, July 1999, pp. 202–205.

American women computer scientists
American computer scientists
Towson University faculty
Living people
Computer science educators
Year of birth missing (living people)
21st-century American women